Ever Since is the sixth studio album by Canadian rapper Maestro, released in 2000 on The Song Corporation, exclusively in Canada. Singles from the album include "U Got da Best" and "Poppa 'Stro". Another version of Ever Since was released as a double album, featuring a compilation of songs by underground Toronto rappers, known as Maestro Presents Breakin' Hingez: Volume One.

Background
Like his previous album, Maestro worked with a younger generation of Toronto hip-hop artists, including members of The Circle (Kardinal Offishall, Saukrates, Solitair, and Frankenstein). Describing the album as "a brand new book all together," he also stated "The vibe of my music has changed, especially with tracks like Poppa 'Stro and Maestro Glycerine." The song "Perseverance" was inspired by former boxer Rubin "Hurricane" Carter.

Track listing

Disc one

Disc two
Maestro Presents Breakin' Hingez: Volume One

References

2000 albums
Albums produced by K-Cut (producer)
Albums produced by Kardinal Offishall
Albums produced by Saukrates
Maestro Fresh-Wes albums